Flight of the Snow Geese is a nature documentary from the Survival series.

External links
The Flight of the Snow Geese WildFilmHistory page

1972 films